The 2011 season was Ulsan Hyundai FC's twenty-eighth season in the K-League in South Korea. Ulsan Hyundai FC will be competing in K-League, League Cup and Korean FA Cup.

Current squad

Match results

K-League

League table

Results summary

Results by round

K-League Championship

Korean FA Cup

League Cup

Squad statistics

Appearances and goals
Statistics accurate as of match played 4 December 2011

Top scorers

Top assistors

Discipline

Transfer

In
 5 July 2011 –  Vinicius – Primeira Camisa
 21 July 2011 –  Lúcio – Gyeongnam FC
 28 July 2011 –  Lee Gi-Dong – Pohang Steelers
 21 September 2011 –  Oh Chang-Sik – Sangju Sangmu Phoenix (military service end)
 21 September 2011 –  Kim Young-Sam – Sangju Sangmu Phoenix (military service end)
 21 September 2011 –  Kim Min-O – Sangju Sangmu Phoenix (military service end)
 21 September 2011 –  Byun Woong – Sangju Sangmu Phoenix (military service end)

Out
 5 July 2011 –  Song Chong-Gug – Tianjin Teda F.C.
 14 July 2011 –  Lee Dong-Won – Busan I'Park
 21 July 2011 –  Jung Dae-Sun – Gyeongnam FC
 21 July 2011 –  Naji Majrashi – Al-Shabab (loan return)
 25 July 2011 –  Magnum – Free Agent
 July 2011 –  Kim Hyo-Gi – Ulsan Hyundai Mipo Dockyard (6 month loan)
 July 2011 –  Choi Dong-Il – Free Agent
 July 2011 –  Shin Hyo-Sup – Free Agent
 July 2011 –  Kwon Oh-Sung – Free Agent
 July 2011 –  Lee Kyung-Sik – Free Agent
 July 2011 –  Byun Sung-Won – Free Agent
 July 2011 –  Park Byung-Gyu – Released (contract terminated)
 12 August 2011 –  Moon Dae-Seong – Dropped out of the club
 30 September 2011 –  Lee Gi-Dong – Free Agent
 30 September 2011 –  Oh Chang-Sik – Free Agent
 30 September 2011 –  Kim Min-O – Free Agent

References

Ulsan Hyundai FC
Ulsan Hyundai FC seasons